GFB may refer to:

 Gabba Front Berlin, a German hardcore techno band
 Genç Fenerbahçeliler, a group for supporters of Turkish sports club Fenerbahçe S.K.
 Georgia Farm Bureau Federation, an American agricultural organization
 The Gilbert's Feed Band, a Portuguese rock band
 GFB, a Hip-Hop/Rap artist